Alpine Valley Ski Area is a ski resort located in Munson Township, Geauga County, in the U.S. state of Ohio, east of Chesterland. It was built in 1965 under the direction of Thomas D. Apthorp, who then continued to operate and manage the resort until 2007. It is located in Ohio's snow belt, allowing it to receive the most natural snowfall out of all of Ohio's ski resorts. Although Northeast Ohio is relatively flat and free of mountains, it has on average a 93-day ski-season per year, allowing Alpine Valley to thrive in the winter months.

In July 2019, it was announced that Vail Resorts would acquire the ski area.

Information 
Alpine Valley offers a variety of 9 trails for skiers, snowboarders and even downhill tubing.  The resort has over 100 instructors for its ski school which is registered with the Professional Ski Instructors of America (PSIA).  Trail levels range from a beginner's bunny hill, to the expert terrain park which boasts Ohio's largest half pipe.  It also offers one of the highest vertical drops of the ski resorts in Ohio. The vertical rise has been measured at 252 feet. Alpine Valley also features high-power lighting for night skiing through the season.
Although Alpine Valley is located in the snow belt of Ohio and receives roughly 120 inches of natural snowfall yearly, the resort also artificially produces snow on all of the runs once temperatures are below 28 degrees Fahrenheit.  
Alpine Valley Ski Area has one main lodge where there is a full cafeteria, a bar, a deck and a lounging area.  There is also a ski and snowboard shop with rental options.

Statistics 

Elevation
 Base: 
 Summit: 
 Vertical rise: 

Trails
 Skiable area: 
 Trails: 9
 Longest run: 
 Average annual snowfall: 

Lifts
 Quad chair
 2 Triple chairs
 2 Surface lifts (1 carpet for the beginner hill, 1 handle tow from the top of the quad lift to top of the summit of upper exhibition black diamond run)

References

External links 
 Official website

Ski areas and resorts in Ohio
Buildings and structures in Geauga County, Ohio
Tourist attractions in Geauga County, Ohio
Vail Resorts